Fort Pierre (1859 - 1863), a fort located in Dakota Territory, later renamed New Fort Pierre.  Site was located  miles north of the site of the original Fort Pierre Chouteau near Pierre, South Dakota.

South Dakota in the American Civil War
Forts in South Dakota